Fernald Ecological Reserve is an ecological reserve of Quebec, Canada. It was established in 1995.

References

External links
 Official website from Government of Québec

Protected areas of Bas-Saint-Laurent
Nature reserves in Quebec
Protected areas established in 1995
1995 establishments in Quebec